The Ministry of Command Area Development is a ministry of the Government of Maharashtra. It is responsible for preparing annual plans for the development of Maharashtra state.

The Ministry is headed by a cabinet level Minister. Devendra Fadnavis is Current Deputy Chief Minister of Maharashtra and Minister of Command Area Development Government of Maharashtrasince 29 June 2022.

Head office

List of Cabinet Ministers

List of Ministers of State

References 

Government of Maharashtra
Government ministries of Maharashtra